Ian Macfarlan (born John Robert Macfarlan; 21 November 1881 – 19 March 1964) was the Deputy Leader of the Australian Liberal Party in the Australian state of Victoria during 1945. He was briefly commissioned as the 35th Premier of Victoria by the Governor and formed a government which brought about the end of the Dunstan Ministry.

MacFarlan was the Member for Brighton from 1928 until 1945 and was Attorney-General and Solicitor-General on 3 occasions, from 26 November 1928 until 11 December 1929 in the government of William McPherson, from 25 July 1934 until 1 April 1935 in the government of Stanley Argyle and from 8 September 1943 until 20 November 1945 in the government of Albert Dunstan.

MacFarlan was a member for the Nationalist Party, which later became the United Australia Party (UAP) in 1931. He became unsatisfied with UAP's strategic inflexibility and left the UAP in 1937 to serve as a liberal independent. In 1943, he was persuaded to rejoin the party as deputy to party leader Thomas Hollway. The UAP became the Liberal Party of Australia in 1945.

Premiership

At the end of September 1945, the government of Albert Dunstan was defeated in the Legislative Assembly, when it voted to refuse Supply to his government. Five Liberals, two Country Party members and one Independent voted with the Labor Opposition, on the grounds of dissatisfaction with the government's legislative program and opposition to Dunstan's leadership.

Instead of resigning, however, Dunstan persuaded the Governor, Sir Winston Dugan, to grant him a dissolution of Parliament, conditional on the budget being passed. These terms drew fire from the Opposition who claimed that the Governor in his letter to the Premier had left himself open to the charge of instructing the Assembly to grant Supply to a ministry which had already been refused it and to no other.

When it became clear that the Assembly would not grant Supply to the Dunstan Ministry, the Governor commissioned Macfarlan, who was the Deputy Leader of the Liberal Party, as Premier, on the production of written assurances of support from the Labor Opposition and from members of the Liberal Party, the Country Party and the Independents whose revolt had led to Dunstan's defeat. Macfarlan formed a government, both Houses passed Votes of Supply, and the dissolution took immediate effect.

At the subsequent state election in November, the Labor Party obtained a majority (with the support of two Independents) and formed a government. The state of parties was Labor 32, United Country Party 18, Liberals 13, Independents 2. Macfarlan was one of the defeated candidates.

With a premiership lasting just 50 days, Macfarlan is the shortest serving Liberal Premier of Victoria, and is the second shortest serving Premier of Victoria behind George Elmslie (13 days).

References

 

1881 births
1964 deaths
Premiers of Victoria
Deputy Premiers of Victoria
Members of the Victorian Legislative Assembly
Treasurers of Victoria
Liberal Party of Australia members of the Parliament of Victoria
Australian people of Scottish descent
Attorneys-General of Victoria
Solicitors-General of Victoria
Politicians from Melbourne
20th-century Australian politicians